N82 may refer to:

 Burarra language
 , a submarine of the Royal Navy
 N82 road, in Ireland
 Nokia N82, a smartphone
 Wurtsboro–Sullivan County Airport, in Sullivan County, New York, United States